Sridhar Ashwath (born 13 May 1993) is an Indian cricketer. He made his List A debut on 27 February 2021, for Pondicherry in the 2020–21 Vijay Hazare Trophy.

References

External links
 

1993 births
Living people
Indian cricketers
Pondicherry cricketers